Yersiniops is a genus of praying mantises native to the Americas.

Species 
The following species are also recognised in the genus Yersiniops:
Yersiniops newboldi
Yersiniops solitarius
Yersiniops sophronicus

Two species, Y. solitarius and Y. sophronicus, can be found in the United States.

See also
List of mantis genera and species

References

Insects of North America
Amelidae